Sinogastromyzon szechuanensis is a species of ray-finned fish in the genus Sinogastromyzon. It is endemic to the upper Yangtze River system in Gansu, Hubei, Guizhou, and Sichuan provinces, China. It lives in rapid flowing streams in hilly areas and is caught in local fisheries. It grows to  SL.

References

Sinogastromyzon
Freshwater fish of China
Endemic fauna of China
Taxa named by Fang Ping-Wen
Fish described in 1930